Martin Joseph Quigley Sr. (May 6, 1890 – May 4, 1964) was an American publisher, editor and film magazine journalist. He founded Exhibitors Herald, which became an important national trade paper for the film industry. He was also the founder of Quigley Publishing.

Publishing and journalism career
Born in Cleveland, Ohio, Quigley began his career as a police reporter in Chicago in 1910. 
He purchased the film trade journal Exhibitors Herald in 1915. Two years later, he acquired and merged Motography. In 1927, he acquired and merged The Moving Picture World and began publishing as Exhibitors Herald and Moving Picture World, later shortened to Exhibitors Herald World. After acquiring Motion Picture News in 1930, he merged these publications into the Motion Picture Herald.

Quigley followed this shortly after with the merger of his remaining three publications, Exhibitors Trade Review, Exhibitors Daily Review, and Motion Pictures Today to form Motion Picture Daily.

In 1929, The Motion Picture Almanac was first published and was published annually.

Role in Motion Picture Production Code
Quigley was an active proponent and co-author of the Motion Picture Production Code, which governed the content of Hollywood movies from the 1930s to the 1960s. A devout Catholic, he began lobbying in the 1920s for a more extensive code that not only listed material that was inappropriate for movies, but also contained a moral system that the movies could help to promote – specifically a system based on Catholic theology.

He recruited Father Daniel Lord, a Jesuit priest and instructor at the Catholic Saint Louis University, to write such a code and on March 31, 1930 the board of directors of the Motion Picture Producers and Distributors Association adopted it formally. This original version especially was once popularly known as the Hays Code, but it and its later revisions are now commonly called the Production Code.

Personal life and death
Quigley held staunch conservative views particularly in the film industry. His son, Martin Quigley Jr., who shared his views, became active in the editing and publication of the various periodicals established by his father, but had far less impact due to the changing times and the decline of the Code.

Quigley Sr. died at Saint Vincent's Catholic Medical Center in Manhattan in 1964, two days before his 74th birthday.

References

1890 births
1964 deaths
American publishers (people)
20th-century American journalists
American male journalists
American Roman Catholics
Censors
Businesspeople from Cleveland
20th-century American businesspeople